Neuroctenus simplex is a species of flat bug in the family Aradidae. It is found in the Caribbean and North America.

References

 Thomas J. Henry, Richard C. Froeschner. (1988). Catalog of the Heteroptera, True Bugs of Canada and the Continental United States. Brill Academic Publishers.

Further reading

 

Aradidae
Insects described in 1876